Chan Kamwilai wrote the lyrics of the Thai National Anthem in 1934, two years after the anthem was first written by Khun Wichitmatra .  These lyrics were used between 1934 and 1939.

References 

Year of birth missing
Year of death missing
Chan Kamwilai
th:ฉันท์ ขำวิไล